Year 274 (CCLXXIV) was a common year starting on Thursday (link will display the full calendar) of the Julian calendar. At the time, it was known as the Year of the Consulship of Aurelianus and Capitolinus (or, less frequently, year 1027 Ab urbe condita). The denomination 274 for this year has been used since the early medieval period, when the Anno Domini calendar era became the prevalent method in Europe for naming years.

Events 
 By place 
 Roman Empire 
 Battle of Châlons: The Emperor Aurelian invades Gaul to campaign against the Gallic Empire (Gaul and Britain). In the Catalaunian Plains, the Romano-Gallic Emperor Tetricus I surrenders to Aurelian and leaves his army without an emperor. The Gallic army is then crushed by Aurelian in a major battle. With the conquests of the Palmyrene Empire and the Gallic Empire, the Roman Empire is united again. However, the heavy losses incurred by the Gallic forces compromises the Rhine frontier.
 Rome greets Aurelian as Restitutor Orbis ("Restorer of the World") and accords him a magnificent triumph (victory procession), which is graced by his captives Zenobia, Tetricus I, and his son Tetricus II.  
 Aurelian reforms the Roman currency, replacing the denarius with a new version of the antoninianus that has a slightly improved silver-to-copper ratio. This overhaul of the currency system causes hyper-inflation. 
 Germanic tribes take advantage of the destroyed Roman forces of the Rhine to raid Gaul. 
 December 25 – Aurelian has the Temple of the Sun dedicated to Sol Invictus, on the third day after the solstice and day of rebirth of the Sun. This religion, which is in essence monotheistic, becomes the state religion of Rome.

 Africa 
 The Kingdom of Aksum attains great prosperity thanks to its control of Red Sea trade.

 By topic 
 Religion 
 March 2 – Mani, a sage of Persia, dies at Gundeshapur after 30 years of preaching his "heresy" at the court of the late Sassanian King Shapur I and on long journeys to Khorasan, India and China. He is executed or allowed to die in prison, and claims to be a prophet of God. Mani combines Zoroastrian dualism with Christian theology, and his disciples gain wide support for Manichaeism, despite opposition from Byzantine and Roman Emperors.
 December 30 – Pope Felix I dies in Rome after a 5-year reign.

 Transportation 
 Japanese shipwrights build a 100-foot oar-powered vessel for Emperor Ōjin. The Japanese will not use sails for another seven centuries.

Births 
 Li Xiong, Chinese emperor of Cheng Han (d. 334)
 Shi Le, Chinese emperor of the Jie state (d. 333)

Deaths 
 March 2 – Mani, prophet and founder of Manichaeism (b. 216)
 August 25 – Yang Yan (or Qiongzhi), Chinese empress (b. 238)
 December 30 – Felix I, bishop of Rome
 Bahram I, king of the Sassanid Empire
 Cao Fang, Chinese emperor of the Cao Wei state (b. 232)
 Lu Kang (or Youjie), Chinese general and politician (b. 226)
 Septimia Zenobia, queen of the Palmyrene Empire (b. 240)
 Xun Yi (or Jingqian), Chinese official and politician

References